Shyam Pathak (born 06 June 1976) is an Indian actor and comedian. He is best known for portraying Patrakaar Popatlal in the long-running Hindi television sitcom Taarak Mehta Ka Ooltah Chashmah. He also acted in 2007 erotic espionage period film Lust, Caution.

Personal life 
Pathak  married Rashmi who was his classmate at the National School of Drama. They have a daughter and two sons.

Pathak started his studies at the Institute of Chartered Accountants of India, but dropped out to join the National School of Drama.

Career 
Since 2009, he has been portraying Patrakaar Popatlal Pandey in Taarak Mehta Ka Ooltah Chashmah

Filmography

Films

Television

References

External links

Living people
Indian male television actors
National School of Drama alumni
1976 births
Male actors from Gujarat
Indian male comedians
21st-century Indian male actors